Abu Qash is a Palestinian village located in the Ramallah and al-Bireh Governorate in the northern West Bank, located north of Ramallah and south of the Birzeit University. According to the Palestinian Central Bureau of Statistics, it had a population of approximately 1,404 in 2007.

Location 
It is bordered by Surda and Jifna to the east, Bir Zeit to the north, Al-Zaytouneh and Ramallah to the west, and by Ramallah and Surda to the south.

History
Two tombs, dating to the Byzantine era have been located here. 

Sherds from the Byzantine and Mamluk eras have been found here.

Ottoman era
Sherds from the early Ottoman era have also been found here. In 1838 it was noted by Edward Robinson as a Muslim village, Abu Kush, in Beni Harith district, north of Jerusalem.

In 1863 Victor Guérin noted it as "A hamlet of about twenty houses, situated on a high hill, the slopes of which are partly covered with vines, olive trees and fig trees."  

An Ottoman village list of about 1870 indicated that the village had 25 houses and a population of 78, though the population count included men, only. It was further noted that it was located just west of Surda. 

In 1882 the PEF's Survey of Western Palestine (SWP) described Abu Kush as: "a very small hamlet, with a well on the north, on an ancient road, with a few olives near."

In 1896 the population of Abu Kusch was estimated to be about 204 persons.

British Mandate era

In the 1922 census of Palestine, conducted by the British Mandate authorities, the population of Abu Qash was 171 Muslims, increasing in the 1931 census to 246 inhabitants, in 49 houses.

In the 1945 statistics Abu Qash had a population of 300 Muslims, and a total land area of 4,751 dunams. 1,166 dunams were for plantations and irrigable land, 1,447 were for cereals, while 42 dunams were built-up areas.

Jordanian era
In the wake of the 1948 Arab–Israeli War, and after the 1949 Armistice Agreements, Abu Qosh came under Jordanian rule. It was annexed by Jordan in 1950.

In 1961, the population was 510.

Post-1967
Since the Six-Day War in 1967, Abu Qash has been under Israeli occupation. 

After the 1995 Oslo II accords, 99.8% of Abu Qash land was classified as Area B land and the remaining 0.2% as Area C.

References

Bibliography

External links
 Welcome To Abu Qashsh
Survey of Western Palestine, Map 14:  IAA, Wikimedia commons 
Abu Qash Village (fact sheet), Applied Research Institute–Jerusalem (ARIJ)
 Abu Qash Village profile, ARIJ
Abu Qash, aerial photo, ARIJ
Locality Development Priorities and Needs in Abu Qash Village, ARIJ

Villages in the West Bank
Ramallah and al-Bireh Governorate
Municipalities of the State of Palestine